The Church of Jesus Christ of Latter-day Saints in Poland refers to the Church of Jesus Christ of Latter-day Saints (LDS Church) and its members in Poland.  At year-end 1989, there were less than 100 members in Poland.  In 2021, there were 2,089 members in 11 congregations.

History

In 1892, the first missionaries entered and established the church in a portion of Germany that became Poland after World War II. The Wroclaw Branch was organized in 1909 and divided into three congregations by 1921.  In 1929, the first LDS Church built meetinghouse was completed for the Selbongen Branch (later Zełwągi).

On May 30, 1977, the LDS Church was officially recognized by the Polish Government. Church president Spencer W. Kimball visited the country on October 24, 1977.

The Warsaw meetinghouse was constructed and dedicated on June 22, 1991. Seminary and institute classes were introduced in 1991.

The Potocki Archive was given to Polish officials by the LDS Church on December 19, 2000.  In 2016, Mateusz Turek, a native of Poland, and his wife, Adrienne, were the first natives called to preside over the Poland Warsaw Mission.

District and congregations

As of February 2023, the following congregations are located in the Poland Warsaw District which encompasses the entire country:

Warsaw Poland District
Gmina Bydgoszcz (Bydgoszcz Branch)
Gmina Gdańsk (Gdańsk Branch)
Gmina Katowice (Katowice Branch)
Gmina Kraków (Kraków Branch)
Legnica Branch
Gmina Łódź (Łódź Branch)
Gmina Lublin (Lublin Branch)
Gmina Poznań (Poznań Branch)
Gmina Szczecin (Szczecin Branch)
Gmina Warszawa (Warszawa Branch)
Gmina Wrocław (Wroclaw Branch)

All congregations within a district are considered branches, regardless of size.

Missions

A number of couple missionaries served in Poland starting in 1977. In 1988, the first of the younger, proselyting missionaries arrived in Poland working out of the Austria Vienna East mission. In July 1990, the Poland Warsaw Mission was created, with Jeff Barnes and David Chandler being the first young missionaries called to serve there.

Temples
As of February 2023, Poland is part of the Freiberg Germany Temple District

See also
Religion in Poland

References

External links
 The Church of Jesus Christ of Latter-day Saints (Poland) - Official Site (Polish)
 The Church of Jesus Christ of Latter-day Saints - Poland Newsroom (Polish)
 ComeUntoChrist.org Latter-day Saints Visitor site
 [https://abn.churchofjesuschrist.org/study/ensign/2005/10/in-poland-a-single-purpose?lang=eng